Tzadik may mean one of the following:

 Tzadik, the Hebrew word for "righteous one", and a title given to a Hasidic spiritual leader
 Tzadikim Nistarim are saintly people who are hidden from view
 The Yiddish name for Tsade, the eighteenth letter of the Hebrew alphabet
 Tzadik Records, a New York-based not-for-profit record label founded by John Zorn that specializes in many music styles, including jazz, avant-garde, classical, and radical Jewish culture (and more)
 Zadik–Barak–Levin syndrome, named after Zadik, Barak, and Levin
 Tzadik, the Armenian word for Easter

See also
 Zadok

Hebrew words and phrases

de:Zaddik
fr:Tzadik
pl:Cadyk